Dutch and Flemish graphics and engravings in National Museum of Serbia represent important part of the vast inventory of the Serbia's National Museum. There are over 220 graphics, etchings and engraves in National Museum of Serbia, Belgrade from Hendrik Goltzius-(10 graphics), Rembrandt - (5 etchings and 3 graphics), Jan Toorop-(15 prints), Sadeler family - (10 works),  Lucas van Leyden, Jan van de Velde, Cornelis Bos, Frederik Bouttats the Younger, Adriaen van Ostade, Nicolaes Pietersz. Berchem, Lucas Vorsterman, James Ensor-(2 works), Aegidius Sadeler, Jozef Peeters, Carel Willink, Marius Bauer etc.

List 

Scenes from Genesis, by Marten de Vos 
Annunciation, graphic by Hendrik Goltzius
Forteress by the river, by Jan van de Velde
Last Supper, graphic by Sadeler family
Hearing, by Jan Dirksz Both
Vision, by Jan Dirksz Both
Ecce homo, copper etching by Rembrandt c. 1636
Self Portrait with hat, graphic by Rembrandt c. 1630
Portrait of Man, etching by Rembrandt
Man with bag, etching by Rembrandt c. 1635
Merchants expulsion from the temple, etching by Rembrandt c. 1635
Old man and boy, graphic by Rembrandt
Old man with hat and pearls, graphic by Rembrandt
Self Portrait with toga, etching by Rembrandt
Self Portrait, graphic  by Rembrandt
Apoteosa, graphic by Peter Paul Rubens
Old Amsterdam, graphic by Lucas van Leyden
Death over the city, graphic by James Ensor

References 

Collections of the National Museum of Serbia
Serbia